U-9 Weddigen is a 1927 German silent war film directed by Heinz Paul and starring Carl de Vogt, Mathilde Sussin and Fritz Alberti. The film is based on the exploits of the submarine SM U-9 under the command of Otto Weddigen during the First World War. It is similar in theme to the previous year's Our Emden, which also depicted the Imperial German Navy in heroic terms.

It was shot at the Johannisthal Studios in Berlin. The film's sets were designed by the art directors Karl Machus and Franz Schroedter.

Cast
 Carl de Vogt as Weddingen 
 Mathilde Sussin as Elisabeth Fuller 
 Fritz Alberti as Elizabeth Fullers Gatte 
 Fred Solm as Percy 
 Gerd Briese as Gerhard v. Dietrischsen 
 Ernst Hofmann as Fritz 
 Hella Moja as Hilde 
 Hans Mierendorff as Fritzs Onkel 
 Hanne Brinkmann as Girl at Dietrichs 
 Willy Mendau as Bursche von Oberleutnant Gerhard Dietrichs

References

Bibliography
 Kester, Bernadette. Film Front Weimar: Representations of the First World War in German films of the Weimar Period (1919-1933). Amsterdam University Press, 2003.

External links

1927 films
Films of the Weimar Republic
Films directed by Heinz Paul
German silent feature films
1927 war films
German war films
Films shot at Johannisthal Studios
World War I submarine films
Silent adventure films
Silent war films
1920s German films